This is a list of Japanese football transfers in the winter transfer window 2011–2012 by club.

J. League Division 1

Albirex Niigata 

In:

Out:

Kashima Antlers 

In:

 

Out:

Omiya Ardija 

In:

Out:

Cerezo Osaka 

In:

Out:

Consadole Sapporo 

In

Out

Yokohama F. Marinos 

In:

Out:

Kawasaki Frontale 

In

Out

Gamba Osaka 

In:

Out:

Nagoya Grampus 

In:

Out:

Júbilo Iwata 

In:

Out:

Urawa Red Diamonds 

In

Out

Kashiwa Reysol

Shimizu S-Pulse 

In:

Out:

Sagan Tosu

Sanfrecce Hiroshima

F.C. Tokyo 

In

Out

Vegalta Sendai 

In

Out

Vissel Kobe 

In:

Out:

J. League Division 2

Avispa Fukuoka

Shonan Bellmare

Ehime F.C.

Fagiano Okayama

Gainare Tottori 

In:

Out:

F.C. Gifu

Giravanz Kitakyushu

Mito HollyHock

JEF United Chiba 

In

Out

Kataller Toyama 

In

Out

Montedio Yamagata

Roasso Kumamoto

Kyoto Sanga F.C.

Thespa Kusatsu

Tochigi S.C.

Oita Trinita

Ventforet Kofu

Tokyo Verdy

Tokushima Vortis

Matsumoto Yamaga

Yokohama F.C.

Machida Zelvia 

In

Out

References 

Transfers
Transfers
Japan
2011-12